Samir Zaid al-Rifai (born 1 July 1966) is a Jordanian politician who was the 38th Prime Minister of Jordan from 14 December 2009 to 9 February 2011.

Early life and education
Al-Rifai hails from a prominent political Jordanian family. He is the son of former Prime Minister Zaid al-Rifai and grandson of former Prime Ministers Samir al-Rifai and Bahjat Talhouni. Rifai received his bachelor's degree in Middle East Studies and minor in economics in Harvard University in 1988. He obtained his master's degree in International Relations from Cambridge University in 1989. He is a father of three and is married to Hala Al-Fayez.

Career
Samir Al-Rifa'i is the Chairman of Hess Corporation (Middle East and North Africa) and currently the Vice President of the Senate of the Hashemite Kingdom of Jordan. Prior to serving in the Senate, Samir Al-Rifa'i held office as the 38th Prime Minister of Jordan between 14 December 2009 and 1 February 2011.
 
Prior to his appointment as Vice President of the Senate in November 2015, Samir was the Chairman of the Senate Foreign Relations Committee between 2013 and 2015.
 
As Prime Minister, Samir led a government that developed a clear seven-point program of economic, social and political advancement. Performance indicators were developed to monitor and evaluate the progress of all projects. Key achievements during his term in office included strengthening the Kingdom's fiscal stability by introducing measures to reduce the government deficit by 30%; strengthening the overall business environment; improving relations between the executive, legislative and judicial branches of government; and running successful national elections in November 2010 that garnered record voter registration and catalyzed youth participation in national political and social affairs.
 
Under his leadership, the Government also accelerated development of a number of strategic infrastructure investment projects, and other strategic partnership agreements with foreign investors. These included the National Railway, the Red-Dead water conveyance system, nuclear cooperation and other strategic partnership agreements in relation to solar and shale oil projects.
 
Samir was also credited with significantly enhancing government accountability and transparency through the introduction of a Ministerial Code of Conduct in his first week in office; the creation of a Delivery Unit at the Prime Ministry with an open web-based reporting platform for citizens, donors and investors to track national and local projects; and the launch of new citizen complaint channels.
 
Before his appointment as Prime Minister, Samir was the founding CEO of Jordan Dubai Capital (JDC), which he established in October 2005. Under his leadership, JDC grew from a nascent fund with an initial subscribed capital of US$300 million to the largest investment company in Jordan with assets under management of approximately US$1.5 billion.  While at JDC, Samir served as Chairman of a number of companies in the energy, financial services and property development sectors, including Jordan Dubai Energy and Infrastructure (JDE&I), Kingdom Electricity Company (KEC), Central Electricity Generation Company (CEGCo), Jordan Dubai Financial (JD Financial), Jordan Dubai Islamic Bank and Jordan Dubai Properties (JD Properties).
 
Samir has also served as the Chairman of the Investment Promotion Committee at the Royal Court, Chairman of the Amman Message Preparatory Committee, member of the Interfaith Follow-up Committee, a member of the Peace Process Supreme Steering Committee, a member of the Board of Directors of the  "King Abdullah II Award for Excellence in Government Performance and Transparency" – Public Sector, a member of the Board of Directors of the Housing Bank for Trade & Finance; Saraya Aqaba and Amlak Mortgage Finance PLC. 
 
 
In the public and not for profit sectors, Samir has served as a member of the board of several academic institutions, committees and organizations, including King's Academy and Talal Abu Ghazaleh Academy. He also chaired.
 
Between 1988 and 2005, Samir served in the Royal Hashemite Court, as Private Secretary and Director of the Office of Crown Prince El Hassan bin Talal (Crown Prince 1965–1999), then as Royal Hashemite Court Secretary-General between 1999 and 2003 where he handled the implementation of a huge administrative and financial restructuring program. In the year 2000 Samir was appointed as advisor to His Majesty King Abdullah II and General Secretary of the Royal Hashemite Court. He also was the Director of King Abdullah's Communications and Public Relations. In 2003, Samir was appointed Minister of the Royal Hashemite Court acting as principal coordinator between His Majesty the King and the Government.

Awards and honors
He was decorated with the Grand Cordon of the Order of Al-Kawkab Al Urduni and the Grand Cordon of the Order of Al-Istiqlal.

See also 
 List of prime ministers of Jordan

References

1966 births
Living people
Alumni of Trinity College, Cambridge
Harvard University alumni
Jordanian people of Palestinian descent
People of the Arab Spring
Prime Ministers of Jordan
People from Amman
Defence ministers of Jordan
Grand Cordons of the Order of Independence (Jordan)
Children of national leaders